KGU may refer to:

 KGU (AM), a radio station (760 AM) licensed to Honolulu, Hawaii, United States
 KGU-FM, a radio station (99.5 FM) licensed to Honolulu, Hawaii
 Kampfgruppe gegen Unmenschlichkeit, an anti-communist group from West Berlin during the early Cold War
 Kansai Gaidai University, a private university in Japan
 Kanto Gakuin University, a private university in Japan
 Kumamoto Gakuen University, a private university in Japan
 Kwansei Gakuin University, a private university in Japan
 Kyonggi University, a private university in South Korea
 IATA-Code of Keningau Airport